Besar Metassan (24 September 1928 – 16 October 2016) was the wife of Pengiran Anak Mohammad Alam and the mother of Pengiran Anak Saleha, the Queen Consort of Hassanal Bolkiah, the 29th Sultan of Brunei. Her full name after her death is Al-Marhumah Yang Teramat Mulia Pengiran Babu Raja Pengiran Anak Hajah Besar binti Pengiran Anak Haji Metassan.

Biography 
Besar was born on 24 September 1928; her father was Pengiran Anak Metassan. She married Pengiran Anak Mohammad Alam in 1943. They had nine children, 37 grandchildren and 26 great-grandchildren. Their eldest daughter, Pengiran Anak Saleha, married Hassanal Bolkiah, the 29th Sultan of Brunei, who is also her first cousin. Other children also married members of Brunei's royal family. She was very active in community and welfare initiatives in Brunei.

Besar died at 5.45am on 16 October 2016 in the Raja Isteri Pengiran Anak Saleha Hospital in Bandar Seri Begawan. She is buried in the Kubah Makam Di Raja.

Honours 
With the consent of Sultan Hassanal Bolkiah, Pengiran Anak Hajah Besar was granted the title of Pengiran Babu Raja. She also received the following awards;
  Family Order of Laila Utama (DK) – Dato Laila Utama
  Order of Paduka Seri Laila Jasa Second Class (DSLJ) – Dato Seri Laila Jasa
  Sultan Hassanal Bolkiah Medal (PHBS)

References 

1928 births
2016 deaths
Bruneian royalty
Bruneian women